Sediq Afghan is an Afghan mathematician. He is the founder and head of the World Philosophical Math Research Center in Kabul, Afghanistan. He is also a political activist.  He had a prominent role in protests in Kabul about Afghanistan- and Islam-related issues, including an anti-American protest in 2003, a hunger strike to protest beatings of journalists by Afghan security officers in 2006, and another one to protest the 2008 Danish Muhammad cartoons.

Education period 
 From 1960 to 1965 student in Sultan Ghayasuddin School, Mazar-e-Sharif.
 From 1965 to 1970 student in Mir Bacha Khan High School, Kabul.
 From 1970 to 1973 student in Qala-e-Moraad Beek High School, Kabul.
 From 1973 to 1976 student in Ansari- High School in Kabul
 From 1976 to 1978 special student in the field of Mathematics for the first time in the history of the country in Polytechnic Institute, Kabul, Afghanistan
From 1982 up to 1988 student of Pedagogy, Faculty of Mathematics, Lypisk, Russia and receiving a master's degree diploma of Mathematics.
From 1988 to 1991 student in Pedagogy- Institute- academy in Leningrad for a doctorate degree in the field of Mathematics.
 In 1990 recognized as founder of Philosophical Mathematics in the World and registered in the Academic Offices of Russia by the name of Sediq Afghan, citizen of Afghanistan.

Occupation 
 From 1978 up to 1979 teacher of Mathematics in Bakhtar High School, teacher training institute and Sultan Razia High School, in Mazar-e-Sharif.
 From year 1979 up to 1982 Teacher of Mathematics in Harbi Shoanzai Air and Air Defense University.
 From 1989 up to 1991 research on Philosophical Mathematics.
Advisor and member of Scientists and Specialists in Russian and American Association.
Advisor in International Support for Peace, and member of Cosmic Science Academy of Russia.
Teacher in Higher Teacher Training Institute of Russia in Lypisk.
General knowledge lecturer in Kef University, in different organizations of Ukraine and Russia universities, teaching Philosophical Mathematics for more than 80 foreign scientists who had Academician, Professor and Doctorate degrees.
 From 1991 up to 1992 shifting the World Philosophical Mathematics Research Center to Kabul and worked as president of this center, and member of Scientific Delegation Academy.
 From 1992 up to 1993 establishment of World Philosophical Mathematics Research Center Agency in Tashkent and at the same time worked as director of Philosophical Mathematics Council in Uzbekistan. Lecturer in Higher Education Organizations in Republic State of Uzbekistan and Police Academy of that country. Political and Science Advisor of President Karimov.
 From 1993 up to 2001 President of World Philosophical Mathematics Research Center. Participation in International Conference of Brain and Spirit Amazement located in Tehran, Iran, and achievement of first rank in the conference.
 Establishment of Philosophical Mathematics Agency in Shiraz and participation in Shiraz University Conferences.
 President of Mathematics, Physics and Technical Centers of Science Academy of Afghanistan and at the same time first deputy of Science Academy.
 From 2001 to 2004 President of World Philosophical Mathematics Research Center and special advisor in cultural issues.

References

External links 
 
  Siddiq Afghan's official website
 

Living people
1958 births
People from Kabul
Afghan philosophers
21st-century mathematicians
Afghan human rights activists
Kabul Polytechnic University alumni
Moscow State University alumni
Afghan scientists